Salim Veragi (born 28 July 1986) is an Indian cricketer. He is a right-handed batsman and a right-arm medium-pace bowler who plays for Baroda. He was born in Tankariya.

Veragi made his first-class debut in January 2008, in the Elite Group semi-final of the 2007-08 Ranji Trophy tournament, playing against Delhi. Batting as a tailender, Veragi finished not-out in the first innings, and was caught and bowled by Chetan Nanda in the second innings of the match.

External links
Salim Veragi at CricketArchive 

1986 births
Living people
Indian cricketers
Baroda cricketers